Azure: Ideas for the Jewish Nation (Tchelet) was a quarterly journal published by the Shalem Center in Jerusalem, Israel. Azure published new writing on issues relating to Jewish thought and identity, Zionism, and the State of Israel. It was published in both Hebrew and English, allowing for the exchange of ideas between Israelis and Jews worldwide.

Azure was established in 1996 and was originally published twice a year, but grew into a quarterly. The journal's first editor-in-chief was Ofir Haivry, followed by Daniel Polisar and David Hazony. Assaf Sagiv was editor in chief from 2007 to 2012.

The journal published Hebrew translations of classic essays by authors such as Immanuel Kant, David Hume, William James, G. K. Chesterton, Martin Luther King Jr., C. S. Lewis, Alasdair MacIntyre, Winston Churchill, Matthew Arnold, and Leo Strauss.

The emphasis of the journal was on strengthening Jewish and Zionist values. It was highly critical of post-national and radical trends in academia, opposed judicial activism in the Israeli legal system, and supported free-market reforms in the Israeli economy.

The publication ceased operations with the Autumn issue, no. 46, alerting its subscribers to this fact mid-2012. According to the letter sent to its subscribers, "circumstances and resources no longer enable [the magazine] to continue publication."

References

External links

The Shalem Center

1996 establishments in Israel
2011 disestablishments in Israel
Defunct magazines published in Israel
Defunct political magazines
English-language magazines
Political magazines published in Israel
Magazines established in 1996
Magazines disestablished in 2011
Mass media in Jerusalem
Quarterly magazines
Judaic studies journals